This is a list of VTV dramas released in 2020.

←2019 - 2020 - 2021→

VTV Special Tet dramas
This drama airs from 21:40 to 22:30, 1st to 4th lunar-new-year days on VTV1. Re-release versions airs on the same channel in Weeknight Prime-time slot.

VTV1 Weeknight Prime-time dramas
These dramas air from 21:00 to 21:30, Monday to Friday on VTV1.

VTV3 Weeknight Prime-time dramas

First line-up
Starting on 7 February 2020, VTV adds Friday prime-time to this time slot.

These dramas air from 20:00 to 20:30, Monday to Friday on VTV3 instead of Monday to Thursday as before.

Second line-up

Monday-Tuesday/Wednesday dramas
Starting on 27 July 2020, the time slot was changed due to positive feedback for Tình yêu và tham vọng. It turned from 2 episodes per week on Monday & Tuesday into 3 episodes per week from Monday to Wednesday.

These dramas air from 21:30 to 22:20 (from 21:40 to 22:30 since 24 August) on VTV3.

Wednesday/Thursday-Friday dramas
Starting on 7 February 2020, VTV re-added Friday prime-time to this time slot for the first time since 2014.

The time slot was changed one more time to "Thursday and Friday" since Cát đỏ (30 July) because the Wednesday prime time was added for Tình yêu và tham vọng.

These dramas air from 21:30 to 22:20 (from 21:40 to 22:30 since 27 August), Wednesday and Thursday (before 7 February), Wednesday to Friday (7 February - 24 July), Thursday and Friday (after 24 July) on VTV3.

VTV3 Weekend Afternoon dramas
These dramas air from 14:00 to 14:50, Saturday and Sunday on VTV3.

See also
 List of dramas broadcast by Vietnam Television (VTV)
 List of dramas broadcast by Hanoi Radio Television (HanoiTV)
 List of dramas broadcast by Vietnam Digital Television (VTC)
List of television programmes broadcast by Vietnam Television (VTV)

References

External links
VTV.gov.vn – Official VTV Website 
VTV.vn – Official VTV Online Newspaper 

Vietnam Television original programming
2020 in Vietnamese television